is a railway station in Minamiaso, Kumamoto, Japan. It is jointly operated by JR Kyushu and the Minami Aso Railway  and is a transfer station between the JR Kyushu Hōhi Main Line and the Minami Aso Takamori Line.

Lines
It is also the starting point for the Takamori Line.

Layout
The station consists of two island platforms serving three tracks. The station forecourt/parking area is located at a higher level than the platforms. From there, a flight of steps descends to the first island platform. The station buildings for both the Minami Aso Railway and JR Kyushu are located on this platform, which also serves the Takamori Line. From the JR Kyushu station, a level crossing gives access to the other island platform which serves two Hōhi Main Line tracks. Both station buildings are unstaffed and serve as waiting rooms. A souvenir shop is located at the station forecourt.

Adjacent stations

Switchback
In order to achieve a practical gradient while ascending  within this distance, trains need to execute a three-stage switchback (changing directions twice) after leaving the station. Trains approaching from  enter Tateno from the west. They then reverse direction and exit the station westward to a point at altitude of  where they reverse direction again onto a track heading for the next station. A signboard on the Tateno Station platform gives passengers a detailed guide to this procedure. The tracks of this switchback were severely damaged by the 2016 Kumamoto earthquakes.

History
Through-traffic was established between Kumamoto and Ōita. The two lines were merged and the entire stretch redesignated as the Hōhi Main Line. With the privatization of Japanese National Railways (JNR), the successor of JGR, on 1 April 1987, the station came under the control of JR Kyushu.

JR Kyushu has commenced repair work, starting first with the sector from Higo-Ōzu to Tateno but has not announced a targeted completion date.

See also
Tateno Station (Saga)
List of railway stations in Japan

References

External links
Tateno (JR Kyushu)

Railway stations in Kumamoto Prefecture
Railway stations in Japan opened in 1916